Hellinsia harpactes is a moth of the family Pterophoridae. It is found in Nepal and India (Assam).

References

Moths described in 1908
harpactes
Moths of Asia